A list of alternative news media outlets in the United Kingdom.

Left-wing 
Alternative media from a left-wing perspective.

 Another Angry Voice
 Byline TV
 Double Down News
 Evolve Politics
 LabourList
 Left Foot Forward
 Novara Media
 The Canary
 The Skwawkbox
 Tribune

Centrist 
Alternative media from a centrist perspective.

 Byline Times
 The London Economic

Right-wing 
Alternative media from a right-wing perspective.

 Westmonster
 Guido Fawkes

References 

British political websites
Alternative media
British news websites
Alternative journalism organizations
United Kingdom journalism organisations